Tierra de Vitigudino  (occasionally referred to as Campo de Vitigudino) is a subcomarca in the comarca of Vitigudino in the province of Salamanca, Castile and León.  It contains the municipalities of Cipérez, El Cubo, Espadaña, Moronta, Peralejos de Abajo, Peralejos de Arriba, Pozos de Hinojo, Villar de Peralonso, Villares de Yeltes, Villarmuerto, Vitigudino and Yecla.

References 

Comarcas of the Province of Salamanca